The Tours Congress was the 14th congress of the French National Front, which was held in Tours on January 15 and 16, 2011.

After 39 years of leadership, Jean-Marie Le Pen didn't run for his reelection. The aim of this congress was also to elect the members of the new Central Committee.

The congress 
 January 15, 2011
 Beginning of the congress
 Extrodirnary general assembly
 Ordinary general assembly
 Debates on the 2011 cantonal elections
 Outgoing president Jean-Marie Le Pen's speech
 Gala dinner
 January 16, 2011
 Beginning of the 2nd day of congress
 Announcement of the results (President and Central Committee)
 Bruno Gollnisch's speech
 National Front Youth's convention
 Central Committee meeting
 New FN President Marine Le Pen's speech
 End of the congress
Outside the congress, several thousand people demonstrated against the National Front along with 25 left-wing associations, trade unions and parties.

Internal campaign 
On April 12, 2010, Jean-Marie Le Pen revealed he would leave office after the next Tours congress.

Marine Le Pen announced on several occasions her candidacy for president of the National Front against Bruno Gollnish.
The 3 main French far-right newspapers Minute, Rivarol and Présent announced they would support Gollnish over Marine Le Pen as they are very hostile towards her.

On abortion, Bruno Gollnisch says he's totally against it. On the contrary, Marine Le Pen is in favor of abortion.

Unlike Marine Le Pen, Gollnish also wants to repeal the Civil solidarity pact;

However, both candidates are in favor of a referendum on death penalty and are strongly opposed to immigration.

62 year-old Gollnisch follows a very conservative political approach whereas Marine Le Pen wants to get away from far-right movements.

On January 4, 2011, Jean-Marie Le Pen announced he'd vote for his daughter, Marine Le Pen but wished Gollnisch all the best for the election.’

Results 
The FN members had until January 8, 2011, to vote. They could only vote by post. .

Presidency

References 

National Rally (France)
Political party assemblies in France
2011 conferences
Marine Le Pen